The year 586 BC was a year of the pre-Julian Roman calendar. In the Roman Empire, it was known as year 168 Ab urbe condita . The denomination 586 BC for this year has been used since the early medieval period, when the Anno Domini calendar era became the prevalent method in Europe for naming years.

Events
 Some sources give 586 BC for the destruction of Jerusalem by King Nebuchadnezzar II of Babylon as an alternative to 587 BC.

Births
 Duke Dao of Jin, ruler of the State of Jin (d. 558 BC)

Deaths
 King Ding of Zhou, king of the Zhou Dynasty of China

References